The 3x3 basketball competitions at the 2017 Asian Indoor and Martial Arts Games was held at the 3x3 Basketball Arena Ashgabat from 19 to 24 September 2017.

Medalists

Medal table

Results

Men

Preliminary round

Pool A

Pool B

Pool C

Pool D

Knockout round

Quarterfinals

Semifinals

Bronze medal game

Gold medal game

Women

Preliminary round

Pool A

Pool B

Pool C

Pool D

Knockout round

Quarterfinals

Semifinals

Bronze medal game

Gold medal game

References

External links 
2017 Asian Indoor and Martial Arts Games – 3x3 Basketball
Results book – 3x3 Basketball

2017
2017 Asian Indoor and Martial Arts Games events
2017 in 3x3 basketball